Arizona Trail is a 1943 American Western film directed by Vernon Keays and starring Tex Ritter.

Plot
A singing cowboy comes home to help his family fight a land-grabber.

Cast
 Tex Ritter as Johnny Trent
 Fuzzy Knight as Kansas
 Dennis Moore as Wayne Carson
 Janet Shaw as Martha Brooks (as Wayne Trent in credits)
 Jack Ingram as Ace Vincent
 Erille Anderson as Dan Trent
 Joseph J. Greene as Dr. J.D. 'Doc' Wallace (as Joseph Greene)
 Glenn Strange as Matt
 Dan White as Sheriff Jones
 Art Fowler as Henchman Curley
 Johnny Bond as Red, Red River Valley Boy
 Red River Valley Boys as musicians / cowhands

References

External links
 

1943 films
1943 Western (genre) films
American Western (genre) films
American black-and-white films
Films directed by Vernon Keays
1940s American films